The Shashiskau River is a river in northern Cochrane District in Northeastern Ontario, Canada. It is part of the James Bay drainage basin, and is a right tributary of the Kesagami River.

The river begins at an unnamed lake in the Shashiskau Hills and adjacent to Kesagami Lake and flows north through Shashiskau Lake, where it takes in the right tributary Little Shashiskau River. It continues north, turns northeast, takes in the right tributary Harvey Creek, and reaches its mouth at the Kesagami River. The Kesagami River flows via the Harricana River to James Bay.

Tributaries
Harvey Creek (right)
Amisk Creek (left)
Little Shashiskau River (right)

See also
List of rivers of Ontario

References

Sources

Rivers of Cochrane District